Forced Entertainment is an experimental theatre company based in Sheffield, England, founded by Tim Etchells in 1984.

Details and history
Forced Entertainment originally focused on making and touring theatre performances before expanding to long durational performance, live art, video and digital media. Their work has been presented throughout the UK and Europe as well as Australia, Japan, Canada and the US.
They develop projects using a collaborative process – devising work as a group through improvisation, experimentation and debate.
Their core members are Tim Etchells (artistic director), Richard Lowdon (designer and performer) and performers Robin Arthur, Claire Marshall, Cathy Naden and Terry O'Connor, who have all been with the company from the start.

A book was published about them in 2004, "Not Even a Game Anymore": The Theatre of Forced Entertainment. In 2012 BBC Radio 4 aired a programme following their creative process developing, writing and rehearsing The Coming Storm.

Projects

Awards
 1999 – 2nd prize for Quizoola!, Międzynarodowy Festiwal Teatralny Kontakt, Toruh / International Theatre Festival "Contact Us", Torun, Poland
 2003 – Awarded Honorary Associates of the National Review of Live Art, at the 17th edition of the NRLA, in recognition of their outstanding contribution to the festival over many years
 2008 – Invitation de Honor, XI Festival Iberoamericano de Teatro de Bogota, Bogotá, Colombia for Bloody Mess
 2013 – Mammalian Diving Reflex's Children's Choice Award, Ruhrtriennale, Germany for The Last Adventures
 2016 – International Ibsen Award

Reception
Joyce McMillan, writing in The Scotsman, called Forced Entertainment "legendary". David Tushingham, writing in the Financial Times, called them "The best group of stage actors in Britain". Robert Avila, writing in the San Francisco Bay Guardian, considered them "internationally successful and storied". Lyn Gardner, writing in The Guardian, has said that "Beyond these shores, however, the company is regarded as one of the greatest British theatrical exports of the past 20 years. ... It is this ability to smash through the pretenses of theatre that has kept the company ahead of the game." They have been described in The Guardian as having "produced some of the most exciting and challenging theatre of the past few decades". Marie-Hélène Falcon, director of Montreal's Festival de Théatre des Amériques, said of Speak Bitterness that "I had never seen anything like it before, a piece that was so political, provocative and poetic because it was a group of artists speaking about their lives – and therefore our lives – in the most direct way," "To this day, Speak Bitterness is one of the very few experiences that have radically changed my understanding and vision of theatre". The British Library claims that the group "continue to tour widely and to great acclaim throughout the world".

Publications about Forced Entertainment
Numerous books and journals on theatre have included chapters and essays about Forced Entertainment.

 "Not Even a Game Anymore": The Theatre of Forced Entertainment, by Judith Helmer and Florian Malzacher. Berlin: Alexander Verlag Berlin, 2004.

Collection
The British Library holds a large collection of video and audio material documenting their performances and talks.

Further reading
 Contemporary Theatre Review and international journal, edited by Franc Chamberlain. Searching for redemption with cardboard wings: Forced entertainment and the sublime chapter by Andrew Quick. Volume 2, issue 2, 1994.
 Art Into Theatre: Performance Interviews and Documents, by Nick Kaye. Harwood Academic Publishers / Psychology Press / Routledge, 1996. 
 Theatre Forum, edited by Jim Carmody, John Rouse, Adele Edling Shank and Theodore Shank. Struggling to Perform: Radical Amateurism and Forced Entertainment chapter by Sara Jane Bailes. Issue number: 26, Winter/Spring 2005.
 Staging the Screen, the use of film and video in theatre by Greg Giesekam. Third-hand Photocopies: Forced Entertainment chapter. Palgrave MacMillan, 2007. .
 Performance Theatre and the Poetics of Failure by Sara Jane Bailes. Profane Illumination: Theatre and Forced Entertainment chapter. Routledge, 2011. .
 Great Lengths: Seven Works of Marathon Theater by Jonathan Kalb. Chapter on Forced Entertainment's durational work. Univ. of Michigan, 2011.

References

External links
 
 'Tim Etchells on performance: why a few heads are better than one' at The Guardian - Tim Etchells describes the Forced Entertainment working process
 The Forced Entertainment Collection at the British Library

Postmodern theatre
Contemporary art organizations
Theatre companies in the United Kingdom
English artist groups and collectives